"Bulls on Parade" is a song by American rock band Rage Against the Machine. It is the second song from their second studio album, Evil Empire (1996). It was released as the album's first single to modern rock radio on February 9, 1996.

Background and composition 
"Bulls on Parade" deals with the U.S. military and its aggressive tactics. It mentions how the arms industry encourages war to obtain military contracts with lines such as, "Weapons, not food, not homes, not shoes, not need, just feed the war cannibal-animal," and "What we don't know keeps the contracts alive and moving."

The song is widely known for its popular guitar solo containing a vinyl scratch effect used by Tom Morello, done by toggling between two pickups, one on and one off, while rubbing his hands on the strings over the pickups to create the effect that someone is scratching a vinyl disc. Morello has stated that the sound he was going for was a "sort of 'Geto Boys' sound, menacing" with E♭ tuning in both guitar and bass and a wah-wah pedal fully in the treble position.

Live performances 

"Bulls on Parade" made its live debut on January 25, 1996, at the Big Day Out festival in Sydney, Australia. The track then made its international debut on Saturday Night Live in April 1996. The band was going to play two songs, but were expelled from the building after hanging American flags upside down from their amplifiers.

At various shows, the band has dedicated the song to George Bush and Tony Blair for their role in the war on terror.

Covers 
"Bulls on Parade" has been covered numerous times by different artists of various genres including British rapper Dizzee Rascal in 2009, among others.

On February 14, 2019, American rapper Denzel Curry performed a cover of the song on the Australian radio station Triple J as part of Like a Version. The cover was met with critical acclaim.

Music video 

The video for "Bulls on Parade", directed by Peter Christopherson and produced by Fiz Oliver at Squeak Pictures, premiered on MTV's 120 Minutes on April 14, 1996. On July 31, 1996 it was nominated for Best Hard Rock Video in the 1996 MTV Video Music Awards.

The video contains footage from the Sydney Big Day Out (January 25, 1996) and their side show at the Hordern Pavilion in Sydney (January 27, 1996). Throughout the video shots of young people protesting in the streets with political signs, military drills, flags, and other similar images are montaged together. An antique-style film is used which promotes scratches, dust and film grain. Several scenes show people wrapping Evil Empire banners on walls, telephone posts and posting up other propaganda posters designed by Barbara Kruger. There is a scene where a character wearing a black "Libertyville" jacket with a baseball cap is painted by the renowned Phantom Street Artist Joey Krebs who paints his iconoclastic figures on city walls. This is the actual portrait created by the street artist of Tom Morello himself. Various lyrics are flashed on top of these scenes in a scrawled sort of chicken-scratch throughout.

Accolades 

The song was voted number 15 on VH1's 40 Greatest Metal Songs.
The song came in 46th place on the Triple J Hottest 100, 1996.
The song came in at 89th place on the Triple J Hottest 100 of All Time in 2009.
The cover of Denzel Curry placed 5th on the Triple J Hottest 100, 2019. 
Its solo is listed number 23 on Guitar World's 100 Greatest Solos list published in 2009.

In other media 
 "Bulls on Parade" features in Guitar Hero III: Legends of Rock where it is unlocked after defeating Tom Morello in a guitar battle. The song also appeared as a playable track in Guitar Hero Live and Rock Band in its Metal Track Pack.
 It is the theme song for the defense of the NFL's Houston Texans, and is played in the stadium at home games to invigorate the crowd and players before games. The song is also played every time the defense takes the field for the first time. The song has been officially endorsed by former Texans LB Connor Barwin.
 For Australian radio station Triple J's Like a Version, American rapper Denzel Curry covered "Bulls on Parade" with Harts on guitar.
 The Prodigy sampled the song in their 1997 single Smack My Bitch Up.
 The New York Red Bulls use the song for the team's goal song.

Track listing 

 Bulls on Parade
 Hadda Be Playing on the Jukebox (Live)

Charts

References

External links 
 
 

Rage Against the Machine songs
Houston Texans
1996 singles
Protest songs
1996 songs
Songs against capitalism
Song recordings produced by Brendan O'Brien (record producer)
Songs written by Tom Morello
Songs written by Brad Wilk
Songs written by Tim Commerford
Songs written by Zack de la Rocha
Epic Records singles